Inches is an album by Les Savy Fav. Initial pressings of the CD came with a DVD featuring live performances, music videos and photos.

The album is a collection of singles from 1995–2004, containing many songs that were previously available on vinyl only. Among the tracks is "The Sweat Descends," which later became a single and was placed on several Best of 2004 rankings. "Meet Me in the Dollar Bin" is a song about one-hit wonders and bands that fall out of style. The song "Reformat" is recorded in two versions: a live version from a concert with fans providing extra vocals and a six-minute 'radio play' about a submarine captain who is executed by guillotine in a football stadium.

Track listing
 "Meet Me in the Dollar Bin" – 4:21
 "Hold On to Your Genre" – 5:16
 "We'll Make a Lover of You" – 3:43
 "Fading Vibes" – 3:58
 "The Sweat Descends" – 4:15
 "Knowing How the World Works" – 4:49
 "Hello Halo, Goodbye Glands" – 3:53
 "Obsessed With The Excess" – 4:05
 "One Way Widow" – 3:18
 "Yawn, Yawn, Yawn" – 2:56
 "No Sleeves" – 4:14
 "Reprobates Resume" – 3:23
 "Reformat (Live)" – 6:10
 "Reformat (Dramatic Reading)" – 2:55
 "Bringing Us Down" – 3:04
 "Our Coastal Hymn" – 4:20
 "Blackouts on Thursday" – 3:27
 "Rodeo" – 2:20

References

2004 compilation albums
Les Savy Fav albums
Frenchkiss Records albums